Jane Close Conoley is an American academic administrator who serves as the president of California State University, Long Beach.

Education
Conoley was awarded a New York State Regents full scholarship and graduated cum laude with a Bachelor of Arts degree in psychology, with minors in biology and philosophy, from the College of New Rochelle. She subsequently obtained a Ph.D. in school psychology from the University of Texas at Austin.

Career
Conoley was the former interim chancellor of the University of California, Riverside following the resignation of former chancellor Tim White, who became the Chancellor of the California State University System. Prior to being selected as the interim chancellor for UC Riverside, Conoley was the dean of the Gevirtz Graduate School of Education at the University of California, Santa Barbara from January 2006 to December 30, 2012, a position which she publicly stated she intended to resume upon the completion of her tenure as interim chancellor of UC Riverside. On January 29, 2014, Conoley was announced as the new president of California State University, Long Beach.

Affiliations
Conoley is a Fellow of the American Psychological Association and the Association for Psychological Science. She is also a member of the American Educational Research Association and the Society for the Study of School Psychology, as of 2004.

References

External links 
 UCR Chancellor Jane Close Conoley Entrance Interview
 School Psychology Misdirected / Jane Close Conoley (2008)

Chancellors of the University of California, Riverside
Chancellors
Living people
Year of birth missing (living people)